Braća Velašević Stadium is a football stadium in Danilovgrad, Montenegro. It is situated near the Zeta riverbank, it is used for football matches. The stadium is the home ground of FK Iskra.

History
The stadium was built after World War II, near the Zeta river, in the centre of town. Over time, it has been renovated a few times, and the last reconstruction was finished in 2016. Today, the capacity of the two stands is 2,500 seats and the floodlights were installed in 2019.

Pitch and conditions
The pitch measures 105×65 meters. The stadium did not meet UEFA criteria for European competitions.

See also
FK Iskra
Danilovgrad

References

External links
 Stadium information
 Stadium information (before reconstruction)

Football venues in Montenegro
Danilovgrad